Quinuabamba District is one of 4 districts in the Pomabamba Province of the Ancash Region in Peru.

Ethnic groups 
The people in the district are mainly indigenous citizens of Quechua descent. Quechua is the first language for the majority (96.60%) of the population with Spanish as the next highest (2.91%) (2007 Peru Census).

See also 
 Ancash Quechua

References

External links
  Official website of the Pomabamba Province

States and territories established in 1941
Districts of the Pomabamba Province
Districts of the Ancash Region